The Joint Special Operations Command (JSOC) is a joint component command of the United States Special Operations Command (USSOCOM) and is charged with studying special operations requirements and techniques to ensure interoperability and equipment standardization; to plan and conduct special operations exercises and training; to develop joint special operations tactics; and to execute special operations missions worldwide.  It was established in 1980 on recommendation of Colonel Charlie Beckwith, in the aftermath of the failure of Operation Eagle Claw. It is headquartered at Pope Field (Fort Bragg, North Carolina).

Overview 
The JSOC is the "joint headquarters designed to study special operations requirements and techniques; ensure interoperability and equipment standardization; plan and conduct joint special operations exercises and training; develop joint special operations tactics." For this task, the Joint Communications Unit is tasked to ensure compatibility of communications systems and standard operating procedures of the different special operations units.

Special Mission Units 

The Joint Special Operations Command also oversees the Special Mission Units of U.S. Special Operations Command. These are elite special operations forces units that perform highly classified activities. So far, only four SMUs have been publicly disclosed:
 The Army's 1st Special Forces Operational Detachment-Delta (Delta Force)
 The Navy's Naval Special Warfare Development Group (DEVGRU / SEAL Team 6)
 The Air Force's 24th Special Tactics Squadron (24 STS)
 The Army's Intelligence Support Activity (ISA)

Additionally, a fifth unit, the Army Ranger's Regimental Reconnaissance Company (RRC), part of USASOC, has been referred to as an SMU.

The Intelligence Support Activity's primary role is as a deep reconnaissance, intelligence-gathering special mission unit, in support of DEVGRU and Delta Force. Delta Force and DEVGRU are the military's primary counter-terrorism units, eliminating high-value targets and performing hostage rescues are their main roles, along with special reconnaissance and direct action assignments. The 24th Special Tactics Squadron attaches personnel as enablers to these two units such as Combat Controllers to provide air traffic control and fire support, Pararescuemen to provide combat medicine and combat search and rescue, and Tactical Air Control Party specialists to co-ordinate close air support. The Joint Communications Unit provides communications capabilities. Units from the Army's 75th Ranger Regiment and 160th Special Operations Aviation Regiment are controlled by JSOC when deployed as part of JSOC Task Forces such as Task Force 121 and Task Force 145.

JSOC has an operational relationship with the CIA's Special Activities Center (SAC).
SAC's Special Operations Group (SOG) often recruits from JSOC SMU personnel.

Advanced Force Operations 
Advanced Force Operations (AFO) is a term used by the U.S. Department of Defense to describe a task force that encompasses personnel from Delta Force, Regimental Reconnaissance Company (RRC) and SEAL Team Six.  Many locations will have a mixture of operators from one of these 3 units working together as a small interoperable team.  Although mainly a term in many cases used to describe a particular subset of Delta Force operators, the term "AFO" also was later known used to describe mixed Special Mission Unit elements doing long-range RECCE/long-range target interdiction operations, etc. According to Gen. Michael Repass, who conducted it in the Iraq War and was very familiar with its use in Afghanistan, "AFO consists of U.S. Secretary of Defense-approved military operations such as clandestine operations. It is logically part of the Operational Preparation of the Battlespace (OPB), which follows the Intelligence Preparation of the Battlespace, a concept well-known in the U.S. and NATO doctrine, OPB is seldom used outside of SOF channels. OPB is defined by the U.S. Special Operations Command as "Non-intelligence activities conducted prior to D-Day, H-Hour, in likely or potential areas of employment, to train and prepare for follow-on military operations".

In the Iraq War, Repass, who first commanded the 10th Special Forces Group, took control of a Joint Unconventional Warfare Task Force, which used the 5th and 10th Groups to conduct AFO. AFO units were heavily involved in Operation Anaconda and Operation Viking Hammer.

JSO Package / Rotational Group 
The Joint Special Operations Package / Rotational Group of the United States Special Operations Command consists of Tier 1 and Tier 2 U.S. Joint Special Operations Command units that train and deploy together.  All Tier 1 and Tier 2 units maintain three separate operational groups within their respective units (The 1st, 2nd, and 3rd battalions of the 75th Ranger Regiment as an example). These groups are essentially identical and deploy within their respective JSOC package.  The rotational cycle is generally for three months.  This allows one group to be deployed overseas, another to be on an 18-hour worldwide emergency deployment notice, and the last group to be training, attending military schools, or on "block leave."  Tier 1 and Tier 2 units take leave together within their respective JSOC package.  This term is called block leave. Given the wartime tasking of JSOC, an additional deployment package is currently being created.  This will allow less operational strain on these units.

Security support 
JSOC has provided domestic law enforcement agencies support during high-profile or high-risk events such as the Olympics, the World Cup, political party conventions, and Presidential inaugurations. Although the use of the military for Local law enforcement purposes in the U.S. is generally prohibited by the Posse Comitatus Act, Title 10 of the U.S. Code expressly allows the Secretary of Defense to make military personnel available to train Federal, State, and local civilian public safety officials in the operation and maintenance of equipment; and to provide such officials with expert advice. Additionally, civilian and military lawyers said provisions in several federal statutes, including the Fiscal Year 2000 Defense Department Authorization Act, Public Law 106-65, permits the secretary of defense to authorize military forces to support civilian agencies, including the Federal Bureau of Investigation, in the event of a national emergency, especially any involving nuclear, chemical, or biological weapons.

In January 2005, a small group of commandos were deployed to support security at the Presidential inauguration. They were allegedly deployed under a secret counter-terrorism program named Power Geyser. The New York Times quoted a senior military official as saying, "They bring unique military and technical capabilities that often are centered around potential WMD events," A civil liberties advocate who was NOT the Constitutionally elected Civil Officer of the U.S. National Organizations but who was told about the program by a reporter said that he had no objections to the program as described to him because its scope appeared to be limited to supporting the counterterrorism efforts of civilian authorities.

Operational history

Operation Enduring Freedom – Afghanistan 
According to the documentary Dirty Wars, by Jeremy Scahill, JSOC was responsible for a number of raids in Afghanistan. One among them took place in Gardez, initially reported by Jerome Starkey but later in other media as well.  The then-current commander William McRaven visited the affected family, offered them a sheep in restitution, and apologized for the incident. In the incident, one US-trained Police commander and another man were killed, as were 3 women, 2 of whom were pregnant, while going to the men's aid.

How many other raids there were during this time, and before and since is difficult to count as JSOC answers only to the White House and not to the rest of the military.   The secrecy around the number of raids could reasonably be counted in the hundreds since they started but only a mere few have been documented as well as the Gardez incident according to Scahill.

Operation Iraqi Freedom 

In May 2003, elements of Task Force 20 (TF 20) remained in Iraq following the invasion and transitioned into hunting down high-value former Ba'athist insurgents under direct JSOC command. In July 2003, Task Force 5 (formerly Task Force 11) and Task Force 20 amalgamated to form Task Force 21 that was then renamed Task Force 121.

On 11 January 2007, President Bush pledged in a major speech to "seek out and destroy the networks providing advanced weaponry and training to our enemies in Iraq."  Sometime in 2007, JSOC started conducting cross-border operations into Iran from southern Iraq with the CIA. These operations included seizing members of Al-Quds, the commando arm of the Iranian Revolutionary Guard, and taking them to Iraq for interrogation, as well as the pursuit, capture or killing of high-value targets in the war on terror. The Bush administration allegedly combined the CIA's intelligence operations and covert action with JSOC clandestine military operations so that Congress would only partially see how the money was spent.

Operations in Pakistan 
According to The Washington Post, JSOC's commander Lieutenant General Stanley McChrystal operated in 2006 on the understanding with Pakistan that US units will not enter Pakistan except under extreme circumstances, and that Pakistan will deny giving them permission if exposed.

That scenario happened according to the Islamic Republic News Agency (IRNA), in January 2006, JSOC troops clandestinely entered the village of Saidgai, Pakistan, to hunt for Osama Bin Laden. Pakistan refused entry.

According to a November 2009 report in The Nation, JSOC, in tandem with Blackwater/Xe, has an ongoing drone program, along with snatch/grab/assassination operations, based in Karachi and conducted both in and outside of Pakistan.

In an October 2009 leak published on the WikiLeaks website, U.S. embassy communication cables from the U.S. Ambassador to Pakistan, Anne W. Patterson, states the Pakistani Army approved the embedding of U.S. Special Operations Forces, including elements from the Joint Special Operations Command, with the Pakistani military to provide support for operations in the country. This goes beyond the original claims of the U.S. that the only role of the Special Forces was in training the Pakistani military. The leak further revealed that JSOC elements involved in intelligence gathering and surveillance and use of drone UAV technology.

JSOC is credited with coordination of Operation Neptune Spear that resulted in the death of Osama bin Laden on 1 May 2011.

Operation Enduring Freedom – Horn of Africa and Al-Qaeda insurgency in Yemen 
A priority target was al-Qaeda cleric Anwar al-Awlaki, a Yemeni-American U.S. citizen, was killed on 30 September 2011, by an air attack carried out by the Joint Special Operations Command. After several days of surveillance of Awlaki by the Central Intelligence Agency, armed drones took off from a new, secret American base in the Arabian Peninsula, crossed into northern Yemen and unleashed a barrage of Hellfire missiles at al-Awlaki's vehicle. Samir Khan, a Pakistani-American al-Qaeda member and editor of the jihadist Inspire magazine, also reportedly died in the attack. The combined CIA/JSOC drone strike was the first in Yemen since 2002—there have been others by the military's Special Operations forces—and was part of an effort by the spy agency to duplicate in Yemen the covert war which has been running in Afghanistan and Pakistan.

On 28 October 2013 a drone strike by JSOC on a vehicle near the town of Jilib in Lower Shabelle killed two senior Somali members of Al-Shabaab. Preliminary evidence suggested that one of them was Ibrahim Ali (also known as Anta), an explosives specialist known for his skill in building and using homemade bombs and suicide vests. The US administration has been reluctant to use drone strikes in Somalia. The reluctance partly centered on questions of whether Al-Shabaab—which has not tried to carry out an attack on American soil—could legally be the target of lethal operations by the military or the CIA. In May 2013, the White House announced that it would carry out targeted killing operations only against those who posed a "continuing and imminent threat to the American people." The strike on 28 Oct was the first known American operation resulting in death since that policy was announced and is considered evidence by some observers that views have changed in Washington and that the Obama administration has decided to escalate operations against Al-Shabaab in the aftermath of the group's Westgate shopping mall attack in Nairobi, Kenya, that took place from 21–24 September 2013 and which left some 70 people dead. According to The New York Times the Yemen government banned military drone operations after a series of botched drone strikes by JSOC, the last of which was a December 2013 drone strike that killed numerous civilians at a wedding ceremony. Despite a ban on military drone operations, the Yemen government allowed CIA drone operations to continue.

Operation Inherent Resolve 

On 25 March 2016, Special Operations Forces in Syria killed ISIL commander Abu Ala al-Afri.

Operation Kayla Mueller

On 26 October 2019 U.S. Joint Special Operations Command's (JSOC) Delta Force conducted a raid into the Idlib province of Syria on the border with Turkey that resulted in the death of brahim Awad Ibrahim Ali al-Badri al-Samarrai also known as Abū Bakr al-Baghdadi. The raid was launched based on a CIA Special Activities Center intelligence collection and close target reconnaissance effort that located the leader of ISIS. Launched after midnight local time, the eight helicopters carrying the teams along with support aircraft crossed hundreds of miles of airspace controlled by Iraq, Turkey and Russia. Upon arrival, efforts were made for Baghdadi to surrender, with those efforts unsuccessful U.S. forces responded by blowing a large hole into the side of the compound. After entering, the compound was cleared, with people either surrendering or being shot and killed. The two-hour raid culminated with Baghdadi fleeing from U.S. forces into a dead-end tunnel and detonating a suicide vest, killing himself along with three of his children. The complex operation was conducted during the withdrawal of U.S. forces northeast Syria, adding to the complexity.

Death of  Abu Ibrahim al-Hashimi al-Qurashi

On 3 February 2022, U.S. President Joe Biden announced that a raid conducted by Joint Special Operations Command in the city of Atme, Syria in Northwest Syria near the border with Turkey, had killed the second leader of ISIS, Abu Ibrahim al-Hashimi al-Qurashi. After U.S. forces evacuated 10 civilians using an Arabic translator and a bullhorn, al-Qurashi proceeded to detonate a bomb that killed himself and 12 others, many of which were members of his family. After the explosion, the U.S. soldiers entered the compound and had a shootout with the survivors, including a deputy of al-Qurashi, who was then shot and killed by the U.S. forces. The raid lasted nearly two hours and no U.S. forces were killed.

List of JSOC commanders

See also 
Central Intelligence Agency's Special Activities Center
Defense Intelligence Agency's Defense Clandestine Service
Special Operations Forces Command (KSSO) – Russian equivalent command
Federal Bureau of Investigation's Hostage Rescue Team (HRT) - HRT performs a number of tactical law enforcement and national security functions in high-risk environments and conditions and has deployed overseas, including with JSOC units.

References

External links 

 Special Ops say lives were on line in Lynch's rescue, by The Washington Times
 US special operations come of age, by Global Defence Review
 Joint Communications Unit
 Joint Special Operations Association
 Joint Special Operations Command

 
1980 establishments in North Carolina